Steel Pulse are a roots reggae band from the Handsworth area of Birmingham, England. They originally formed at Handsworth Wood Boys School, and were composed of David Hinds (lead vocals, guitar), Basil Gabbidon (lead guitar, vocals), and Ronald McQueen (bass); along with Basil's brother Colin briefly on drums and Mykaell Riley (vocals, percussion). Steel Pulse were the first non-Jamaican act to win the Grammy Award for Best Reggae Album.

History

Basil Gabbidon and David Hinds became inspired to form Steel Pulse after listening to Bob Marley and The Wailers' Catch a Fire. The band formed in 1975; their debut single release "Kibudu, Mansetta And Abuku" arrived on the small independent label Dip, and linked the plight of urban black youth with the image of a greater African homeland. They followed it with "Nyah Luv" for Anchor. They were initially refused live dates in Caribbean venues in Birmingham due to their Rastafarian beliefs. During the popularization of punk rock in the mid-1970's, Steel Pulse began to play punk venues such as the Hope and Anchor in London and The Electric Circus in Manchester in 1976.

Aligning themselves closely with the Rock Against Racism organization and featuring in its first music festival in early 1978, they chose to tour with sympathetic elements of the punk movement, including the Stranglers, XTC etc. Eventually they found a more natural home in support slots for Burning Spear, which brought them to the attention of Island Records.

Island Records era (1977–1980) 
Their first release for Island was the "Ku Klux Klan" single, a tilt at the evils of racism, and one often accompanied by a visual parody of the sect on stage. By this time their ranks had swelled to include Selwyn Brown (keyboards), Steve "Grizzly" Nisbett (drums), Alphonso Martin (vocals, percussion) and Mykaell Riley (vocals). Their debut album, Handsworth Revolution (recorded in 1977 and released in early 1978), was part the evolution of roots reggae outside Jamaica. However, despite critical and moderate commercial success over three albums, the relationship with Island Records had soured by the advent of their third album, Caught You (released in the US as Reggae Fever).

The band made their US concert debut at the Mudd Club in New York in 1980.

Tom Terrell, who would later serve as their manager, was instrumental in masterminding a Steel Pulse concert on the night of Bob Marley's funeral, which was broadcast live around the world from the 9:30 Club, 930 F Street, N.W., Washington, D.C., on 21 May 1981.

Elektra Records era (1982–1985) 
In 1982, Steel Pulse switched to Elektra Records, and unveiled their most consistent collection of songs since Handsworth Revolution with True Democracy, distinguished by the Garvey-eulogizing 'Rally Round' cut. A further definitive set arrived in Earth Crisis in 1984. However, Elektra chose to take a leaf out of Island's book in trying to coerce Steel Pulse into a more mainstream vein, asking them to emulate the pop-reggae stance of Eddy Grant. Babylon the Bandit was consequently weakened, but did contain "Not King James Version".

Steel Pulse released Babylon The Bandit in 1985, for which the band won a Grammy award.

MCA Records era (1988–1997) 
Their next move was to MCA for State of Emergency (1988), which retained some of the synthesized dance elements of its predecessor.

Rastafari Centennial, Steel Pulse's first live record, was recorded live at the Elysee Montmartre in Paris, over three nights in January 1992, and dedicated to the hundred year anniversary of the birth of Haile Selassie. It was the first recording since the defection of Alphonso Martin, leaving the trio of Hinds, Nisbett and Selwyn. While they still faced criticism at the hands of British reggae fans, in the United States their reputation was growing, becoming the first ever reggae band to appear on the Tonight television show. Their profile was raised further when, in 1992, Hinds challenged the New York City Taxi & Limousine Commission in the Supreme Court, asserting that their cab drivers discriminated against black people in general and Rastafarians in particular. The lawsuit was later dropped by Steel Pulse.

In 1989, the group contributed I Can't Stand it to the soundtrack of Spike Lee's film Do The Right Thing.
 
In 1994, the group headlined some of the world's biggest reggae festivals including Reggae Sunsplash USA, Jamaican Sunsplash, Japan Splash and Northern California annual Reggae on the River Festival. In 1986, Steel Pulse contributed a version of "Franklin's Tower" on Pow Wow Records' Fire on the Mountain: Reggae Celebrates the Grateful Dead compilation. They recorded The Police's "Can't Stand Losing You" for a reggae compilation of Police tunes that appeared on the Ark 21 label. Rastanthology, a 17-song collection of Steel Pulse classics (the 1996 compilation was released on the band's own Wise Man Doctrine label).

Later years (1997–present) 

In 1997, the band released Rage and Fury.

Until February 2001, it had been many years since Pulse had performed in their hometown of Birmingham. They decided to perform at the Ray Watts memorial concert, which was held at the Irish Centre. Pulse shared the stage with Watts' band, Beshara, along with other artists from Birmingham.

In 2004, Steel Pulse returned to their militant roots with African Holocaust – their eleventh studio album. With guest appearances by Damian Marley, Capleton, and Tiken Jah Fakoly (on the track African Holocaust), the album is a collection of protest and spiritual songs, including "Global Warning" (a dire warning about climate change), "Tyrant", a protest song against political corruption, and "No More Weapons", an anti-war song. Also featured on the album is the Bob Dylan song, "George Jackson".

In 2007, the band released a music video for the track "Door of No Return". The video was produced by Driftwood Pictures Ltd., and was shot on location in Senegal and New York City. The video was directed by Trishul Thejasvi and produced by Yoni Gal. The video had its world premier at the Times 51st BFI London Film Festival in October 2007.

In a 2013 interview with Midnight Raver, David Hinds indicated that a new studio album and documentary, tentatively titled Steel Pulse: The Definitive Story, would be released in 2014. However, on 10 July 2014 Midnight Raver reported that, according to Hinds, both the studio album and documentary will be delayed until at least 2015.

In anticipation to a new Steel Pulse album, the Roots Reggae Library has indexed two compilation albums of the latest Steel Pulse singles. The albums are called Positivity and Jah Way, both named after tracks on the albums.

In October 2018, Steel Pulse announced their new album, the first in 14 years, Mass Manipulation, was released on Rootfire Cooperative a non-traditional label which provides interest free loans and label services to independent musicians. The single "Stop You Coming and Come" was released on 7 December. The album was nominated for the 2020 Grammy Awards.

Awards and nominations 
A Grammy award was awarded for their 1986 album Babylon the Bandit. Steel Pulse has received nominations for Victims (1991), Rastafari Centennial (1992), Rage and Fury (1998), Living Legacy (2000). and Mass Manipulation (2019).

Personnel

Current members
David Hinds – lead vocals, rhythm guitar (1975–present)
Selwyn Brown – keyboards, backing vocals (1975–present)
Sidney Mills – keyboards, backing vocals (1988–present)
Wayne C# Clarke – drums (2005–present)
Amlak Tafari – bass (2005–present)
David Ellecirri Jr. - lead guitar (2012–present)
Stephen Bradley – trumpet (2017–present)
Zem Audu – saxophone (2017–present)
Baruch Hinds – rap and backing vocals (2017–present)

Former members

Drummers
Colin Gabbidon – drums (1975–1976)
Donovan Shaw – drums (1976–1977)
Steve Nisbett – drums, percussion (1977–2001; died 2018)
Alphonso Martin – percussion, vocals (1977–1991)
Mykaell Riley – percussion, backing vocals (1977–1978)
Conrad Kelly – drums (1994–2005)
Guitarists
Basil Gabbidon – lead guitar, backing vocals (1975–1982)
Melvin Brown – lead guitar (1982–1989)
Clifford "Moonie" Pusey – lead guitar (1989–2015)
Donovan McKitty – lead guitar (2008–2015; died 2017)
Bass players
Ronald McQueen – bass (1975–1983)
Alvin Ewen – bass, percussion (1983–2005)
Keyboard players
Tyrone Downie – keyboards (1985)
Errol Reid – keyboards (1985–1994)

Horns players
Jerry Johnson – saxophone (1992–1997, 2012–2019)
Steve Morrison – trombone (1991–1992)
James Renford – saxophone (1991–1992)
Kevin Batchelor – trumpet (1992–1997)
Clark Gayton – trombone (1992–1997)
Micah Robinson – trombone (1998–2015)
Backing vocalists
Makiesha McTaggert – backing vocals (2005–2016)
Yaz Alexander – backing vocals (1991–1997)
Donna Sterling – backing vocals (1998–2004)
Sylvia Tella – backing vocals (1998–1999)
Melanie Lynch – backing vocals (2004–2009)
Traciana Graves – backing vocals (2004)
Marea Wilson – backing vocals (2004–2005)

Timeline

Discography

Studio albums
Handsworth Revolution (1978)
Tribute to the Martyrs (1979)
Caught You (1980)
True Democracy (1982)
Earth Crisis (1984)
Babylon the Bandit (1986) Grammy Award Winner – Best Reggae Album
State of Emergency (1988)
Victims (1991)
Vex (1994)
Rage and Fury (1997)
African Holocaust (2004)
Mass Manipulation (2019) Grammy Award Nominee - Best Reggae Album

Live albums
Rastafari Centennial - Live in Paris (Elysee Montmartre) (1992)
Living Legacy (1998)

Compilation albums
Reggae Greats (1984)
Smash Hits (1993)
Rastanthology (1996)
Sound System: The Island Anthology (1997)
Ultimate Collection (2000)
20th Century Masters: The Millennium Collection: The Best of Steel Pulse (2004)
Rastanthology II: The Sequel (2006)
Love This Reggae Music: 1975–2015 (2016)

Compilation appearances
Short Circuit: Live at the Electric Circus (1977) (one track – Makka Splaff)
Hope & Anchor Front Row Festival (1978) (one track - Sound Check)
Urgh! A Music War (1981)

Filmography
Live from the Archives (1992)
Introspective (2005)

Singles
 "Kibudu Mansatta Abuku" (1976)
 "Nyah Luv" (1977)
 "Ku Klux Klan" (1978)
 "Prodigal Son" (1978)
 "Prediction" (1978)
 "Sound System" (1979)
 "Reggae Fever" (1980)
 "Don't Give In" (1980)
 "Ravers" (1982)
 "Your House" (1982)
 "Steppin' Out" (1984)
 "Reaching Out" (1988)
 "Save Black Music" (1986)
 "Taxi Driver" (1993)
 "Bootstraps" (1994)
 "Brown Eyed Girl" (1996)
 "Global Warning" (2004)
 "No More Weapons" (2004)
 "Door of No Return" (2007)
 "Put Your Hoodies On [4 Trayvon]" (2014)
 "Stop You Coming and Come" (2018)
 "Cry Cry Blood" (2019)

References

External links
 

Black British musical groups
British reggae musical groups
English Rastafarians
Grammy Award winners
Island Records artists
Musical groups from Birmingham, West Midlands
Performers of Rastafarian music
Roots Reggae Library
Political music groups